This article is a detailed discography for American country pop artist Charlie Rich.

Albums

1960s

1970s

1980s and 1990s

Singles

1960s

1970s and 1980s

Other singles

Promotional singles

Notes

A ^ Classic Rich also peaked at number 6 on the RPM Country Albums chart in Canada.

References

External links

Country music discographies
 
 
Discographies of American artists